was a Japanese athlete and architect. He competed in the men's triple jump at the 1952 Summer Olympics. He later became a prominent architect.

References

External links

1925 births
1998 deaths
Athletes (track and field) at the 1952 Summer Olympics
Japanese male triple jumpers
Olympic athletes of Japan
Place of birth missing
20th-century Japanese architects